Ace of Hearts Records is a Boston-based independent label founded in 1978 by Rick Harte, who also produced all its releases.  It recorded and released Boston area post-punk and garage rock bands in the early 1980s, including Mission of Burma, Birdsongs of the Mesozoic, Roger Miller, Neats, Lyres, The Real Kids, John Felice, Nervous Eaters, Del Fuegos, The Neighborhoods, Martin Paul, Wild Stares, Infliktors, Classic Ruins, Crab Daddy, Chaotic Past, Tomato Monkey, and Heat from a DeadStar.

Overview
Ace of Hearts released recordings by bands based in Boston. One of their releases, "Prettiest Girl" by the Neighborhoods, sold ten thousand copies. The record company had been established in 1978 by Rick Harte.

Discography
 Infliktors Where'd You Get That Cigarette 1979 (45)
 Classic Ruins 1+1<2 1980 (EP – 3 songs)
 The Neighborhoods Prettiest Girl 1980 (45 Vinyl)
 Mission of Burma Academy Fight Song 1980 (45)
 Mission of Burma Signals, Calls, and Marches 1981 (EP – 6 songs)
 Mission of Burma Trem Two 1981 (45)
 Mission of Burma Vs. 1981 (LP)
 Lyres AHS 1005 1981 (EP – 4 songs)
 Lyres Help You Ann 1981 (45)
 Neats The Monkey's Head in the Corner of the Room 1982 (EP – 7 songs)
 Neats Caraboo 1983 (45)
 Neats Neats 1983 (LP)
 Birdsongs of the Mesozoic Birdsongs of the Mesozoic 1983 (EP – 5 songs)
 Lyres On Fyre (New Rose) 1984 (LP+CD)
 Birdsongs of the Mesozoic Magnetic Flip 1984 (LP)
 Mission of Burma The Horrible Truth About Burma 1985 (LP)
 Lyres Someone Who'll Treat You Right/She Pays The Rent/You've Been Wrong 1985 (12", 45)
 Lyres Someone Who'll Treat You Right 1985 (45)
 Birdsongs of the Mesozoic Beat of the Mesozoic 1985 (EP – 5 songs)
 Nervous Eaters Hot Steel and Acid 1986 (CD – 9 songs)
 Lyres Lyres Lyres (New Rose) 1986 (LP+CD)
 Roger Miller No Man Is Hurting Me 1986 (LP)
 Roger Miller Groping Hands 1986 (12", 45)
 Roger Miller The Big Industry 1987 (LP, CD)
 Mission of Burma Live at the Bradford 1988 (video)
 Mission of Burma Mission of Burma (Ryko) 1988 (CD comp.)
 Lyres A Promise is a Promise (New Rose) 1988 (LP+CD)
 Lyres Box Set AHS 1005, On Fyre, A Promise Is a Promise (New Rose) 1988 (EP+LPs)
 Lyres Here's a Heart w/Stiv 1988 (12", 45)
 Birdsongs of the Mesozoic Sonic Geology (Ryko) 1988 (CD Comp.)
 John Felice and the Lowdowns Nothing Pretty 1988 (LP)
 John Felice and the Lowdowns Nothing Pretty (New Rose) 1988 (CD)
 The Wild Stares The Wild Stares Land of Beauty 1992 (CD)
 Tomato Monkey Mostly Torso 1992 (45)
 Chaotic Past Distraught and Out of Control 1992 (45)
 Chaotic Past Load 1993 (EP, CD)
 Tomato Monkey Blowrod 1993 (CD Radio Sampler – 4 songs)
 Tomato Monkey Blowrod 1993 (CD)
 Tomato Monkey Chow Call 1994 (CD)
 Chaotic Past Moodchanger 1994 (EP, CD)
 Crab Daddy Ancient Baby 1994 (CD)
 Various Artists The Wasted Years 1995 (CD)
 Mission of Burma Signals, Calls, and Marches (Ryko) 1997 (CD – 6 songs)
 Mission of Burma Vs. (Ryko) 1997 (CD)
 Mission of Burma The Horrible Truth About Burma (Ryko) 1997 (CD)
 Lyres AHS 1005 (Matador) 1998 (CD – 13 songs)
 Lyres On Fyre (Matador) 1998 (CD – 14 songs)
 Lyres Lyres Lyres (Matador) 1998 (CD – 13 songs)
 Lyres A Promise is A Promise (Matador) 1998 (CD – 17 songs)
 Chaotic Past Yer-in 1999 (CD)
 Chaotic Past New Young Girl 2000 (45, CD single)
 Martin Paul Crooked Country 2000 (EP, CD)
 Mission of Burma A Gun to the Head (Ryko) 2004 (CD comp.)
 Various Artists 12 Classic 45s 2006 (CD)
 Mission of Burma Signals, Calls, and Marches (Matador) 2008 (CD+DVD – 10 songs)
 Mission of Burma Vs. (Matador) 2008 (CD+DVD – 16 songs)
 Mission of Burma The Horrible Truth About Burma (Matador) 2008 (CD+DVD – 14 songs)
 Heat from a Deadstar CD 2 Songs including Messy Kid, Ad Astra 2009
 Heat from a Deadstar Seven Rays of the Sun 2009 (CD – 13 songs)
 Birdsongs of the Mesozoic Dawn of the Cycads (Cuneiform) 2009 (Double CD – 32 songs)
 Neats 1981–1984 The Ace of Hearts Years 2009 (CD – 22 songs)
 The Real Kids Shake…Outta Control (vinyl EP – 4 songs)
 The Real Kids Shake…Outta Control CD (CD – 12 songs) 
 The Real Kids Shake…Outta Control (vinyl LP - 10 songs, Licensed to Ugly Pop, Canada) 
 The Real Kids 28:18:39 (vinyl LP - 8 songs)
 Nervous Eaters Hot Steel and Acid (CD - 14 songs)
 LYRES Lucky 7 (Box Set, 7-45s Licensed to Munster Records(Distrolux)/Spain)
 William Hooker/Roger Miller/Lee Ronaldo Monsoon (pending)

References

 Legendary Harte article in The Boston Phoenix
 Ace of Hearts on Epitonic

External links
 Official site

American record labels
Record labels established in 1978
Mission of Burma